The 2021 RAN Sevens was the 21st edition of the tournament. The event was hosted by the Turks and Caicos Islands at the Meridian Field from 16 to 17 October. Those competing will have an opportunity to secure a place at the 2022 World Rugby Sevens Challenger Series. The winner of the 2022 Challenger Series will compete at the World Rugby Sevens Series as the 16th core team. Jamaica defeated Mexico in the final 21–7 and were crowned 2021 Champions. Belize made their debut at a World Rugby tournament. There was initially supposed to be 11 teams competing but the Cayman Islands and the Dominican Republic withdrew.

Teams 
The following nine teams competed:

Pool stage

Pool A

Pool B

Pool C

Knockout stage

Plate Playoffs

Pool 1

Pool 2

Finals

Plate Final

5th–6th-place final

3rd–4th-place final

Final

Standings

References 

2021
2021 rugby sevens competitions
2021 in North American rugby union
rugby union
October 2021 sports events in North America